Slat, slats, or SLAT may refer to:

 Slat (aircraft), aerodynamic surfaces on the leading edge of the wings of fixed-wing aircraft
 a Lath, a narrow strip of straight-grained wood used under roof shingles or tiles
 Vertical or horizontal pieces of a window blind

People
 Slats Jordan (1878–1953), Major League Baseball third baseman and outfielder
 Slats Gill (1901–1966), American basketball and baseball head coach at Oregon State University
 Glenn Hardin (1910–1975), American hurdler, 1936 Olympic gold medalist
 Slats Long (1906–1964), American jazz clarinetist
 Max Zaslofsky (1925–1985), American National Basketball Association player and American Basketball Association coach
 Glen Sather (born 1943), Canadian National Hockey League team president and former coach and general manager
 Michael Slater (born 1970), Australian television presenter and former cricketer
 Boyan Slat (born 1994), Dutch inventor, entrepreneur and engineering student

Arts and entertainment

 A character in the American comic strip Abbie an' Slats
 Slats Grobnik, a character created by American newspaper columnist Mike Royko
 Slats (1919–1936), a lion that appeared as the Leo the Lion mascot of MGM movie studio, used on black-and-white silent movies from 1924 to 1928.
 Slat, a work by American minimalist sculptor Richard Serra (born 1939)
 Slats Slats Slats, a song by Skrillex

SLAT
 AQM-127 SLAT (Supersonic Low-Altitude Target), a United States Navy target drone
 Systeme de Lutte Anti-Torpille, a naval anti-torpedo system; see for example FREMM multipurpose frigate
 Second Level Address Translation, a computer technology
 Software Liberty Association of Taiwan, a member of the Free Standards Group
 Super Low Altitude Test Satellite, a JAXA satellite

Other uses
 Slat, Kentucky, United States, an unincorporated community
 A rarely used alternate name for a slash (/)

See also
 
 
 Plank (disambiguation)

 Slet (disambiguation)
 Slit (disambiguation)
 Slot (disambiguation)
 Slut (disambiguation)

Lists of people by nickname